Aequipecten is a genus of scallops, marine bivalve mollusks in the family Pectinidae.

Fossil records
This genus is very ancient. It is known in the fossil records from the Triassic to the Quaternary (age range: from 247.2 to 0.0 million years ago). Fossils are found in the marine strata throughout the world.

Species
Species within the genus Aequipecten include:
 Aequipecten acanthodes (Dall, 1925) — thistle scallop
 Aequipecten audouinii (Paryaudeau 1826) — sometimes given as a subspecies of A. opercularis
 Aequipecten commutatus (Monterosato, 1875) — Canestrello scallop
 Aequipecten gibbus (Linnaeus, 1758) — calico scallop 
 Aequipecten glyptus (Wood, 1828) — red-ribbed scallop
 Aequipecten heliacus (Dall, 1925)
 Aequipecten irradians — Atlantic bay scallop
 Aequipecten lindae (Petuch, 1995) 
 Aequipecten lineolaris (Lamarck, 1819) — wavy-lined scallop
 Aequipecten linki (Dall, 1926)
 Aequipecten muscosus — rough scallop
 Aequipecten opercularis (Linnaeus, 1758) — Queen scallop
 Aequipecten tehuelchus (D'Orbigny, 1846) — Tehuelche scallop

References

External links

 Catalogue of Life

Pectinidae
Bivalve genera